The Piraeus Football Clubs Association (abbreviated E.P.S.P. (Ε.Π.Σ.Π.) was founded in 1925 after the termination of E.P.S. Athens-Piraeus. It was the second largest football association in Greece and was officially recognized by FIFA alongside E.P.S. Athens, as the Hellenic Football Federation had not been established at the time. After the establishment of Alpha Ethniki it became the Piraeus Football Clubs Association for amateurs.

History
Olympiacos participated in Piraeus Championship from the first time in 1925, immediately after its inception. They were invincible and won the final defeating Piraikos with 4-2. In the early years they were a great opponent of Ethnikos Piraeus, who won the championship of 1928, while the two clubs tied in 1930 and were declared both champions. Ethnikos Piraeus also won the Championship in 1939, the only time Olympiacos participated and lost from another team. Since the 1930-1931 championship and up to 1959 Olympiacos played without serious opponents and won all the championships. They didn't participate in the championships of 1932, 1933 and 1936 because of the formation of the division while they were eliminated in 1928 after just one game and were excluded from the Hellenic Football Federation with AEK and Panathinaikos because they refused to participate in the national championship.

Champions

List of champions 1959- 
1959-1960 : Atromitos Piraeus
1960-1961 : Panelefsiniakos
1961-1962 : Vyzas Megara
1962-1963 : A.E. Nikaia
1963-1964 : Doxa Piraeus 
1964-1965 : Aias Salamina
1965-1966 : A.O.K. Faliro
1966-1967 : Moschato
1967-1968 : D.A.O. Argonautis 
1968-1969 : Saronikos F.C.
1969-1970 : Enosis Aspropyrgos
1970-1971 : Saronikos F.C.
1971-1972 : A.P.O. Keratsini
1972-1973 : A.O. Syros
1973-1974 : Amfiali
1974-1975 : Amfiali
1975-1976 : Enosis Aspropyrgos
1976-1977 : Ionikos F.C.
1977-1978 : Vyzas Megara
1978-1979 : A.O. Neapoli
1979-1980 : Iraklis Elefsina
1980-1981 : A.O. Nikaia
1981-1982 : D.A.O. Argonautis 
1982-1983 : Peramaikos
1983-1984 : A.S. Pontioi
1984-1985 : Doxa Piraeus 
1985-1986 : Amfiali
1986-1987 : A.S. Drapetsona
1987-1988 : Mandraikos F.C.
1988-1989 : Amfiali
1989-1990 : A.P.O. Keratsini
1990-1991 : Iraklis Elefsina
1991-1992 : Enosis Aspropyrgos
1992-1993 : A.O. Peiraiki
1993-1994 : D.A.O. Argonautis 
1994-1995 : Mauros Aetos
1995-1996 : Atromitos Piraeus, Mandraikos F.C.
1996-1997 : Moschato, Chalkidona
1997-1998 : Vyzas Megara, A.S. Pontioi
1998-1999 : Atromitos Piraeus
1999-2000 : Atromitos Piraeus, Aias Salamina
2000-2001 : Ermis Korydallos, A.O. Manis
2001-2002 : Enosis Aspropyrgos, Aias Salamina
2002-2003 : A.P.O. Keratsini, A.S. Pontioi
2003-2004 : Moschato, Saronikos F.C.
2004-2005 : Atromitos Piraeus, A.E. Nikaia
2005-2006 : A.E. Peramatos, Iraklis Nikaia
2006-2007 : Chalkidona, Peramaikos
2007-2008 : Amfiali, A.P.O. Keratsini
2008-2009 : Ellas Pontion, Aris Amfialis
2009-2010 : Atromitos Piraeus, Moschato
2010-2011 : Ellas Pontion, Olympiada Keratsiniou
2011-2012 : Peramaikos, Aris Amfialis
2012-2013 : Ethnikos Piraeus, Moschato
2013-2014 : Ethnikos Piraeus, Odigitria
2014-2015 : A.P.O. Keratsini, Ikaros Kallitheas
2015-2016 : A.P.O. Aetos Korydallou, Proodeftiki F.C.
2016-2017 : A.P.O. Keratsini, Odigitria

Structure
The championship of E.P.S. Piraeus consists of three categories. The champion of the category A rises in the Regional Championship. The structure of the 2016-17 season championship of the amateur association is as follows:
 Category A: 32 teams (two groups of 16 teams)
 Category B: 27 teams (one groups of 14 teams and another one of 13)
 Category C: 15 teams

References

External links
 Official website

Sports organizations established in 1925
Association football governing bodies in Greece
Sport in Attica
Sport in Piraeus